Sullivan Heights Secondary is a well known high school located in Surrey,  British Columbia, Canada.

Sullivan Heights opened on October 24, 2000, with a student population of over 1000 students (grades 8 through 10), with grade 11 being added in the 2001–02 school year, and grade 12 being added in the 2002–03 school year. Today, Sullivan Heights is home to thousands of students (in grades 8 through 12), and over 100 staff members.

The school's programs include a strong Performing Arts Program including Dance, Drama, Musical Theatre, Band, and Choir. Other programs include Leadership, Electronics, Drafting, Sewing, Cooking, Tourism, and Information Technology. The school also offers a wide array of extracurricular activities including Student Council, Grad Council, Athletics, Outdoors Club, Programming and Improv /Theatre Sports.

The school has an attached theatre, The Bell Centre For Performing Arts. The centre cost about $8 million to construct and, although its main focus is to be a rental venue for community user groups, it is also used by the school from time to time, with a highlight being an annual matinee for local elementary schools that sees the entire 1000 seat theatre full.

The school features fields for Football, Kabaddi, Cricket, Soccer

Notable alumni
 Ashley Burr, reporter with CityNews Vancouver & Breakfast Television
 Elicia MacKenzie, winner of the reality show How Do You Solve a Problem Like Maria?

References

High schools in Surrey, British Columbia
Educational institutions established in 2000
2000 establishments in British Columbia